Peter Katsis is an American music manager.  He co-founded the management and production company Prospect Park, and was a founding partner of The Firm.

Biography
At the age of 23, Katsis discovered and managed his first group, the Chicago industrial alt-rock band Ministry.

During the mid-1980s, while in Chicago, he was closely associated with the birth of house music. He acted as an agent for many of the young Chicago house acts. Such artists included top names like Marshall Jefferson and Adonis. He organized some of their first gigs in New York and London, at venues like the Paradise Garage and the Ministry of Sound.

Katsis later moved to Los Angeles and became a partner in talent and entertainment agency The Firm.  At the agency he helped the careers of Backstreet Boys, Enrique Iglesias, Korn, Thirty Seconds to Mars, Snoop Dogg, One Direction, Audioslave, Limp Bizkit, Staind and others. In a 2002 article in Vanity Fair, Katsis was described as "the best manager in the music business, period" by Aaron Ray, a former senior executive at The Firm.

Katsis has strategized the launch of many arena and stadium concert tours such as the Backstreet Boys Into The Millennium Tour in 1999. At that time, the 26-truck tour sold a Ticketmaster record of 735,000 tickets in less than one hour.

In 2005, he helped produce the only concert by an American rock band in Castro-era Cuba. The group Audioslave played for over 100,000 fans in the capital city of Havana.

From 2008 to 2014, Katsis, with partners Jeff Kwatinetz and Rich Frank, founded Prospect Park Entertainment. During that time he continued his work managing the music careers of artists like The Smashing Pumpkins, Jane's Addiction, Korn, Audioslave, Ice Cube, and the Backstreet Boys.

After leaving Prospect Park Entertainment in 2015 Katsis became a partner at Deckstar Entertainment in Beverly Hills which later merged with the James Grant Group from London, ENG. The combined companies were eventually renamed the YM&U Group, and while  there Katsis managed artists like Morrissey, Bush, Fever 333, Jane's Addiction, 311, and Liz Phair, 5 Seconds of Summer, The Pentatonix and many others.

Katsis currently owns and runs his own company in West Hollywood, CA known as Stole The Show Management, and still manages many famous music groups to this day.

References

External links
Interview, HitQuarters Jun 2001

American music managers
Living people
Year of birth missing (living people)